Volodymyr, previously known as Volodymyr-Volynskyi from 1944 to 2021, is a small city located in Volyn Oblast, in north-western Ukraine. It is the administrative centre of Volodymyr Raion and the center of Volodymyr hromada. It is one of the oldest cities in Ukraine and the historic centre of the region of Volhynia; it served as the capital of the Principality of Volhynia and later as one of the capital cities of the Kingdom of Galicia–Volhynia. Population: 

The medieval Latin name of the town "Lodomeria" became the namesake of the 19th century Austro-Hungarian Kingdom of Galicia and Lodomeria, of which the town itself was not a part.  south from Volodymyr is Zymne, where the oldest Orthodox Monastery in Volynia is located.

Name
The city was named after Vladimir the Great (Volodymyr the Great), who was born in the village of Budiatychi, about 20 km from Volodymyr, and later also abbreviated Lodomeria,Ladimiri. Following the partitions of Poland and the annexation of Volhynia by the Russian Empire in 1795, it was called Volodymyr-Volynskyi (Vladimir-Volynsky) to distinguish it from Vladimir-on-Klyazma. The name was not in use between 1919 and 1939 when the city was part of Poland. In 1944, the name Volodymyr-Volynskyi was restored.

On 1 October 2021, the city council voted to drop the regional qualifier and change the name of the city to just Volodymyr. The decision had to be ratified by Ukraine's national parliament (Verkhovna Rada) to take effect. On 14 December 2021 parliament approved the name change (it was supported by 348 people's deputies). The city of Vladimir in Russia opposed the name change, claiming that there can be only one city called Vladimir.

Over the centuries its residents and rulers have used various names:

History 
The city is one of the oldest towns in Ukraine and historical Ruthenia (or Rus). It was originally a stronghold founded by Volodymyr the Great. In 988 the city became the capital of Volodymyr Principality and the seat of an Orthodox bishopric, as mentioned in the Primary Chronicle.

In 1160 the building of Sobor of Dormition of The Holy Mother of God was completed. By the 13th century the city became part of Galicia–Volhynia as one of the most important trading towns in the region. Upon the conquest of Batu Khan in 1240, the city was subordinated to the Mongol Empire together with other Ruthenian principalities. In 1241, the Mongol army gathered near the town before the first Mongol invasion of Poland. In the 14th century, Metropolitan Theognostus of all Rus' resided in the city for several years before moving to Moscow.

In 1349 King Casimir the Great captured the city, and subsequently it became part of the Kingdom of Poland. The Polish king began building a castle, destroyed by Lithuanians after 1370, and established a Catholic bishopric in Włodzimierz, later transferred to nearby Lutsk, which in the 15th century instead of Volodymyr became the leading city and capital of Volhynia. In 1370 it was taken by the Grand Duchy of Lithuania (after 1386 part of the Polish–Lithuanian Union) and it was not until the Union of Lublin of 1569 that it returned to the Crown of Poland. In the meantime the city was given Magdeburg town rights in 1431. In 1491 and 1500 it was invaded by Tatars. From 1566 to 1795 it was part of the Volhynian Voivodeship. It was a royal city of Poland. Most of the city's landmarks were built at that time, including the Baroque church of St. Joachim and St. Anne, the Jesuit church, the Dominican monastery and the chapel of St. Josaphat.

On July 17, 1792, the Battle of Włodzimierz took place in the vicinity of the town: a numerically inferior Polish force led by Tadeusz Kościuszko defeated the Russian army. The city remained a part of Poland until the Third Partition of Poland of 1795 when the Russian Empire annexed it. That year the Russian authorities changed the name of several cities in Volhynia including Novohrad-Volynskyi (former Zwiahel). Volodymyr-Volynsky stayed within Russian Partition till 1917. In the 19th century, as part of anti-Polish repressions, Russians demolished the Dominican church and Capuchin monastery, and the former Jesuit and then Basilian church was converted into an Orthodox church.

In the 18th and 19th centuries the town started to grow rapidly, mostly thanks to large numbers of Jews settling there as a result of Russian discriminatory policies. By the second half of the 19th century they made up the majority of local inhabitants. According to the Geographical Dictionary of the Kingdom of Poland, in the late 19th century the city had 8336 inhabitants, 6122 of them Jews. In 1908, the railway station was opened.

Immediately after World War I, the area became disputed by the re-established Polish state, Bolshevist Russia and the Ukrainian People's Republic, with the Polish 17th Infantry Regiment capturing it overnight on January 23, 1919. In the interbellum the city was a seat of a powiat within the Volhynian Voivodeship of Poland and an important garrison was located there. In 1926, the Volyn Artillery Reserve Cadet School (Wołyńska Szkoła Podchorążych Rezerwy Artylerii) was established in Włodzimierz. Before the outbreak of World War II the city's population was predominantly Polish and Jewish, with a Ukrainian minority.

World War II

Following the Nazi-Soviet Pact the city was occupied by Soviet forces on 19 September 1939. On 23 June 1941, the city was occupied by Germany and attached to the Reichskommissariat Ukraine, and immediately the Jewish community of 11,554 began to be persecuted. Between September 1 and 3, 1942, 25,000 Jews from the local area were shot at Piatydni. On November 13, 1942, the Germans killed another 3,000 Jews from the town near Piatydni. During World War II, a German concentration camp was located near the city. About 140 Jews returned to the city after the war but most later emigrated. By 1999 only 30 remained.

In 1943, occupied Włodzimierz became a shelter for Poles escaping the genocide carried out by Ukrainian nationalists of the UPA. UPA attacks took place mainly in the suburbs. Poles were defended both by the Polish police established with the consent of the Germans and an illegal self-defense unit. In Włodzimierz, Poles suffered from overpopulation, hunger and diseases. According to later research by Władysław Siemaszko and Ewa Siemaszko, a total of 111 Poles were killed in a dozen UPA attacks in Włodzimierz. After the war, the vast majority of Polish residents of Włodzimierz was displaced to the post-war Polish territories, as Włodzimierz was annexed from Poland by the Soviets.

The city was liberated by the Red Army on 20 July 1944 and annexed to the Ukrainian SSR.

Post-war
A Cold War air base was located north-east of the town at Zhovtnevy.

Since 1991, the city has been part of Ukraine.

Discovery of mass graves from World War II
A series of mass graves were discovered in 1997, with exhumations completed by 2013. Originally thought to be an example of NKVD mass murder, similar to the Katyn massacre and the Vinnytsia massacre, the Volodymyr-Volynskyi murders were shown in 2012 to have been carried out by German forces, most likely the Einsatzgruppen C. The primary archeological evidence for German culpability was that most of the bullet shell casings were dated 1941 and were from a German factory. Testimony by a Jewish survivor of the city, Ann Kazimirski (née Ressels), who lived on Kovelska Street, recorded by the USC Shoah Foundation corroborated the view that the perpetrators were German and that the victims were primarily Jewish. Anthropological analysis of the remains led to the conclusion that three quarters of the victims were women and children. The 747 victims were reinterred in local city cemeteries.

Climate

Churches in Volodymyr 

The oldest place of worship in the town is the Temple of Volodymyr, erected several kilometres from the modern town's centre and first mentioned in a chronicle (letopis) of 1044. The oldest existing church is the Dormition of the Mother of God built by Mstyslav Izyaslavovych in 1160. By the late 18th century it fell into disuse and finally collapsed in 1829, but was restored between 1896 and 1900. The third of the old Orthodox churches is the Eastern Orthodox Basil the Great's cathedral, which was erected in the 14th or 15th century, though local legends attribute its construction to Volodymyr the Great, who supposedly built it some time after 992.

In 1497, Duke Alexander Jagiellon erected a Catholic church of Holy Trinity and a Dominican monastery. In 1554, another wooden Catholic church was founded by Princess Anna Zbaraska, which was later replaced by a new St. Joachim and Anna's church in 1836. In 1755, a Jesuit church was erected there by the starost of Słonim Ignacy Sadowski and, in 1780, the Greek Catholic Josaphat's church was added to the list. Following the Russian Empire's takeover of the town, in the effect of the Partitions of Poland, both shrines were confiscated and donated to the authorities of the Orthodox Church, which converted them to an Orthodox monastery and church, respectively, while the Dominican monastery was converted to an administrative building.

Museum 

There also exists Volodymyr-Volynsky Historical Museum, an architectural monument of the 19th century.

International relations

Twin towns - Sister cities
Volodymyr is twinned with:
 Dubno, Ukraine
 Korosten, Ukraine
 Hrubieszów, Poland
 Kętrzyn, Poland
 Łęczyca, Poland
 Zwickau, Germany
 Raseiniai, Lithuania

Gallery

Famous People 
 Josaphat Kuntsevych – archeparch (archbishop) of the Ukrainian Greek Catholic Church, also a martyr and saint of the Catholic Church
 Amtylochius – bishop and saint of Eastern Orthodox Church
 Ipatii Potii – bishop, writer, and humanist, also co-founder and supporter of the Union of Brest
 Wacław Hipsz – protonotary apostolic of the Catholic Church and the Prefect of Secondary Education in Volodymyr-Volynsky until 1939
 Janusz Bardach – surgeon, Kolyma survivor, and memoirist
 Juliusz Bardach – legal historian and professor of the University of Warsaw.
 Teresa Lewtak-Stattler – social activist, stalag prisoner, Councillor of the Warsaw Capital, and meritorious member of Polish Home Army who took part in special operations against German Nazi high-ranking officials in German-occupied Poland during World War II and was involved in underground humanitary aid to Jews from Warsaw Ghetto
 Józef Han – chairman of society of veterans of 27th Home Army Infantry Division (Poland) in Hrubieszów
 Ann Kazimirski (née Ressels) – Holocaust survivor, teacher, lecturer, and author of the autobiographical book Witness to Horror, in which she describes growing up in Volodymyr (Ludmir), surviving the Holocaust, and making a new life in Canada for her and her family
 Jerzy Strojnowski – psychiatrist, philosopher and writer, also professor and co-founder of Psychology Institute at John Paul II Catholic University of Lublin
 Jerzy Antczak – film director.
 Jan Tadeusz Stanisławski – writer, satirist, and actor
 Ahatanhel Krymsky – orientalist and polyglot
 Hannah Rachel Verbermacher (1805–1888), also known as the Maiden of Ludmir or the Ludmirer Moyd, the only independent female Rebbe in the history of the Hasidic movement

References

 «Jewish Volodymyr. The History and Tragedy of Jewish Community of Volodymyr-Volyns’kyi» by Volodymyr Muzychenko, Lutsk, 2011. 256 p. (in Ukrainian) Володимир Музиченко. “Володимир єврейський. Історія і трагедія єврейської громади м. Володимира-Волинського” .

Link 
Official Web site of the Volodymyr-Vohlynsky historical museum

Cities in Volyn Oblast
Wołyń Voivodeship (1921–1939)
Vladimir-Volynsky Uyezd
Volhynian Voivodeship (1569–1795)
Former capitals of Ukraine
Magdeburg rights
Cities of regional significance in Ukraine
Holocaust locations in Ukraine
Vladimir the Great
City name changes in Ukraine
Rus' settlements